The Leinkauf Historic District is a historic district in the city of Mobile, Alabama, United States. It was placed on the National Register of Historic Places on June 24, 1987. It is roughly bounded by Government, Eslava, Lamar, and  Monterey Streets. The buildings range in age from the 1820s to early 20th century and cover a variety of 19th- and 20th-century architectural styles.

References

1987 establishments in Alabama
Historic districts in Mobile, Alabama
National Register of Historic Places in Mobile, Alabama
Historic districts on the National Register of Historic Places in Alabama